Shine a Light was a British television comedy which aired in 1970. Starring Timothy Bateson, Tony Selby and Howell Evans, it was produced by Yorkshire Television. All six episodes are believed to be lost.

References

External links
Shine a Light on IMDb

1970 British television series debuts
1970 British television series endings
Lost television shows
English-language television shows
ITV sitcoms
1970s British comedy television series
Television series by Yorkshire Television